Matutaera Nihoniho (1850–1914) was a New Zealand Ngāti Porou leader, soldier, storekeeper and assessor.

References

1850 births
1914 deaths
New Zealand military personnel
New Zealand traders
Ngāti Porou people